Kuhsalar may refer to:
 Kuhsalar, Khoda Afarin
 Kuhsalar-e Olya, Meyaneh County
 Kuhsalar-e Sofla, Meyaneh County